Barsi is a surname. Notable people with the surname include:

Etelka Barsi-Pataky (1941–2018), Hungarian politician
Judith Barsi (1978–1988), American actress
Kinga Barsi (born 1976), Hungarian alpine skier
László Barsi (1904–1975), Hungarian sprinter